Auratonota rutra is a species of moth of the family Tortricidae. It is found in Ecuador.

References

Moths described in 2007
Auratonota
Moths of South America